Julius W. Blackwell (born ; death date unknown) was an American politician and a member of the United States House of Representatives that represented fourth and third districts of Tennessee in the United States House of Representatives.

Biography
Blackwell was born in Virginia in approximately 1797 and attended the public schools. He moved to Tennessee and settled in Athens, McMinn County.  He was a coppersmith by trade. He owned slaves. He married Mahala D.

Career
Blackwell was elected as a Democrat by the fourth district to the Twenty-sixth Congress, which lasted from March 4, 1839, to March 3, 1841.  He was an unsuccessful candidate for re-election to the Twenty-seventh Congress in 1840.

After the number of electoral districts Tennessee held had been reduced and reapportioned, he was elected by Tennessee's third district to the Twenty-eighth Congress, which lasted from March 4, 1843, to March 3, 1845.  He was an unsuccessful candidate for re-election to the Twenty-ninth Congress in 1844.

Death
The date, and the location of his death is unknown as well as the place of his interment.

References

External links

1790s births
Year of death unknown
19th-century deaths
People from Virginia
Democratic Party members of the United States House of Representatives from Tennessee
American slave owners
19th-century American politicians